National Significant Numbers (NSN): four to nine digits.

The International dialling format for Tajikistan varies from 7 to 12 digits:
 +992 ABCD XXXXX (for ABCD area codes)
 +992 ABCDE XXXX (for ABCDE area codes)
 +992 ABCDEF XXX (for ABCDEF area codes)

e.g. for Dushanbe: +992 372 XXXXXX (Area code: three digits. Subscriber number: six digits).

Mobile numbers: +992 55 XXX XXXX

Area codes in Tajikistan

References

Tajikistan
Tajikistan communications-related lists